Augurus was an ancient city and former bishopric in Roman Africa, now a Latin Catholic titular see. Its presumed site is at the ruins of Sidi-Tahar and Sidi-Embarec in Algeria.

History 
Augurus was important enough in the Roman province of Numidia to become one of its many suffragan sees, and faded like most.

Titular see 
The diocese was nominally restored in 1933 as Latin titular bishopric.

It has had the following incumbents, of the fitting episcopal (lowest) rank :
 Michel-Maurice-Augustin-Marie Darmancier, Marists (S.M.) (1961.12.22 – 1966.06.21)
 Victor-Julien-André Gouet (1966.12.30 – 1988.12.15)
 Gilles Lussier (1988.12.23 – 1991.09.07)
 Simon Akwali Okafor (1992.03.06 – 1994.09.09)
 Edwin Michael Conway (1995.01.24 – 2004.08.09)
 João Carlos Petrini (2005.01.12 – 2010.12.15)
 José Francisco Falcão de Barros (2011.02.16 – ...), Auxiliary Bishop of the Military Ordinariate of Brazil (Brazil)

See also 
Catholic Church in Algeria

References

External links 
 GCatholic with incumbent bio links

Catholic titular sees in Africa